Xenic may refer to:

 Xenon
 Xenon compounds
 Xenic acid
 Sino-Xenic language
 Sino-xenic pronunciation
 Xenic Chinese characters
 Xenogender

See also

 
 Xenon (disambiguation)
 Xeno (disambiguation)